Yunan County (postal: Watnam) is a county in the west of Guangdong Province, China, bordering Guangxi to the west. It is under the administration of the prefecture-level city of Yunfu. As of 2020, Yunan County has a population of 532,679.

Administrative divisions
As of 2020, Yunan County administers 15 towns and 4 township-level tree farms.

Towns 

Other township-level divisions 
Yunan County has 4 tree farms which function as township-level divisions: Xijiang Tree Farm, Tongmen Tree Farm, Dali Tree Farm, and Tongle Tree Farm.

Climate

Demographics 

As of the end of 2020, Yunan County has a total population of 532,679.

Vital statistics 
In 2020, Yunan County recorded 5,936 births (11.14 per thousand) and 4,067 deaths (7.63 per thousand), giving the county a rate of natural increase of 3.51‰.

Sex ratio 
As of 2020, Yunan County is home to 282,705 males and 249,974 females, giving the county a sex ratio of 113.09 males per 100 females.

Urbanization 
As of 2020, 167,230 of Yunan County's residents lived in urban areas, giving the county an urbanization rate of 31.39%.

Notable people: 
 Pang yu sheng ( 龐遇聖）： doctor of Ming dynasty 

 Sit ying yi( 薛影儀）： Hong Kong actress

Economy 
The gross domestic product of Yunan County totals 12.338 billion RMB as of 2020, a 2.9% increase from the previous year. Of this, 3.032 billion RMB (24.57%) came from the county's primary sector, 2.802 billion RMB (22.71%) came from the county's secondary sector, and 6.504 billion RMB (52.72%) came from the county's tertiary sector. As of 2020, the annual per capita disposable income of the county's urban residents totals 27092 RMB, and totals 17,102 RMB for the county's rural residents, reflecting a 5.7% and 7.0% increase from the previous year, respectively.

References 

County-level divisions of Guangdong
Yunfu